The men's épée was one of eight fencing events on the fencing at the 1992 Summer Olympics programme. It was the twenty-first appearance of the event. The competition was held on 1 August 1992. 70 fencers from 30 nations competed. Each nation was limited to three fencers. The event was won by Éric Srecki of France, the nation's fifth victory in the event (second-most behind Italy's six). France also took bronze, with Jean-Michel Henry winning the bronze medal match. France's podium streak in the event extended to four Games. Pavel Kolobkov of the Unified Team took silver.

Background

This was the 21st appearance of the event, which was not held at the first Games in 1896 (with only foil and sabre events held) but has been held at every Summer Olympics since 1900.

Three of the eight quarterfinalists from 1988 returned: gold medalist Arnd Schmitt of West Germany (now competing for united Germany), bronze medalist Andrey Shuvalov of the Soviet Union (now competing for the Unified Team), and fourth-place finisher Sandro Cuomo of Italy. Shuvalov was the reigning (1991) World Champion. Manuel Pereira of Spain was another World Champion (1989) competing in Barcelona.

Estonia and Singapore each made their debut in the event. Some former Soviet republics competed as the Unified Team. France, Great Britain, Sweden, and the United States each appeared for the 19th time, tied for most among nations.

Competition format

The 1992 tournament used a three-phase format roughly similar to prior years in consisting of a group phase, a double-elimination phase, and a single-elimination phase, but each phase was very different from previous formats.

The first phase was a single round (vs. 3 rounds in 1988) round-robin pool play format; each fencer in a pool faced each other fencer in that pool once. There were 10 pools with 7 fencers each. The fencers' ranks within the pool were ignored; the overall winning percentage (with touch differential and then touches against used as tie-breakers) were used to rank the fencers. The top 52 advanced to the second phase, while the other fencers were eliminated.

The second phase was a modified, truncated double-elimination tournament. 12 fencers received a bye to the second round (round of 32), while the 40 fencers ranked 13–52 played in the round of 64. Fencers losing in the round of 64 were eliminated, while the remaining rounds were double elimination via repechages. The repechages (but not the main brackets) used a complicated reseeding mechanism. Ultimately, the 4 fencers remaining undefeated after the round of 8 advanced to the quarterfinals along with 4 fencers who advanced through the repechages after one loss.

The final phase was a single elimination tournament with quarterfinals, semifinals, and a final and bronze medal match.

All bouts were to 5 touches. In the second and third phases, matches were best-of-three bouts.

Schedule

All times are Central European Summer Time (UTC+2)

Results

Group round

Fencers were ranked by win percent, then touch differential, then touches against. This ranking, with adjustments to ensure that no two fencers of the same nation were in the same bracket (noted in parentheses), was used to seed the elimination round brackets.

Elimination rounds

Main brackets

Main bracket 1

Ciszewski, Wong, Tanabe, Paz, and Normile were eliminated after the round of 64. The losers in the round of 32 faced off, with Randazzo beating Jang and Davidson beating Pop to advance to the repechage. The losers of the round of 16, Shuvalov and Lazzarini, advanced directly to the first round of the repechage. Vánky, having lost in the round of 8, went to the third round of the repechage. Borrmann won the bracket, advancing to the quarterfinals.

Repechage qualifiers 1

Main bracket 2

Sandegren, di Tella, Lenzun, Al-Hamar, and Kuhn were eliminated after the round of 64. The losers in the round of 32 faced off, with Depta beating Schmitt and Kulcsár beating Lee to advance to the repechage. The losers of the round of 16, Shong and de la Peña, advanced directly to the first round of the repechage. Srecki, having lost in the round of 8, went to the third round of the repechage. Kaaberma won the bracket, advancing to the quarterfinals.

Repechage qualifiers 2

Main bracket 3

Maroto, O'Brien, Milan, Ječmínek, and Zuikov were eliminated after the round of 64. The losers in the round of 32 faced off, with Chouinard beating Jacquet and Kravchuk beating Cuomo to advance to the repechage. The losers of the round of 16, Lenglet and Marx, advanced directly to the first round of the repechage. Rivas, having lost in the round of 8, went to the third round of the repechage. Kovács won the bracket, advancing to the quarterfinals.

Repechage qualifiers 3

Main bracket 4

Hegedűs, McLean, Kim, Pereira, and Pantelimon were eliminated after the round of 64. The losers in the round of 32 faced off, with Nowosielski beating Lundblad and Mazzoni beating Nawrocki to advance to the repechage. The losers of the round of 16, Henry and Douba, advanced directly to the first round of the repechage. Felisiak, having lost in the round of 8, went to the third round of the repechage. Kolobkov won the bracket, advancing to the quarterfinals.

Repechage qualifiers 4

Repechage rounds 1 and 2 

The fencers were reseeded: the eight fencers who had lost in the round of 16 were reseeded as 1–8 while the eight fencers who had lost in the round of 32 but won the repechage qualifiers were reseeded as 9–16. Rematches of main bracket matches were avoided. For example, original seed #2 Mazzoni would have been reseeded as #9 because he was the top-seeded fencer who had advanced through the repechage qualifiers. That would have placed original #4 Kulcsár as (new) #10, setting up a rematch against (new) #7 de la Peña; Kulcsár and Mazzoni were swapped to #9 and #10, respectively. Original seeds are shown in parentheses in the brackets.

Repechage rounds 1 and 2 bracket 1

Repechage rounds 1 and 2 bracket 2

Repechage rounds 1 and 2 bracket 3

Repechage rounds 1 and 2 bracket 4

Repechage round 3 

The fencers were reseeded again. Seeds 1–4 were given to round 8 losers, based on their original seeds (Vánky and Felisiak, who had been swapped to avoid having two German fencers in main bracket 1, were reseeded as if they had not been swapped). Seeds 5–8 were given to the winners of the second round of the repechage, based on their original seeds—except that Henry was moved from #6 to #5 to avoid a rematch with Felisiak.

Repechage round 3 bracket 1

Repechage round 3 bracket 2

Repechage round 3 bracket 3

Repechage round 3 bracket 4

Final rounds

The fencers were reseeded a final time. Seeds 1–4 were given to the round of 8 winners, based on their original seeds. Seeds 5–8 were given to the winners of the third round of the repechage, based on their original seeds.

Final classification

References

Fencing at the 1992 Summer Olympics
Men's events at the 1992 Summer Olympics